Hellamaa rahu is an island belonging to the country of Estonia.

See also
List of islands of Estonia

Islands of Estonia
Hiiumaa Parish